The One-Eyed King is a 2016 Spanish comedy film based on play by Marc Crehuet.

References

External links 

2016 films
2016 comedy films
Spanish comedy films
2010s Spanish-language films
2010s Catalan-language films
2010s Spanish films